Chaim Nahor (1914–1993) was a Jewish Israeli artist specializing in abstract art, printing, landscapes and murals. He was part of the developing art coloney in Tzfat. He was associated with Aharon Avni, Steinhardt and Edward Matuschak.

Early life and migration to Israel
Nahor was born in Poland. When he was one, his family moved to Germany. They later moved to Israel and escaped the Final Solution, spending time in Tel Aviv, Jerusalem and Tzfat.

In Tel Aviv he worked as a graphic designer and married until 1947 when he relocated to Jerusalem. He remarried and lived with his wife, Ruth, and lived many years between Haifa and Tzfat in the north of Israel.

Career
Despite being trained in the arts informally, Nahor worked as a professor of the arts in Bezalel Academy of Art & Design, Jerusalem. He wrote and contributed to many texts and picture books on the arts, including stone, wood, oil, water (sculpture and painting): Sy Gresser, Leon Bibel, Paul Fux, Chaim Nahor, B'nai B'rith Klutznick National Jewish Museum.

In 1959, Nahor won the first place commission for the mural of the Carmelit Underground Train, Haifa.

Painting philosophy
Nahor was focused on the use of landscape to give motion, which he interpreted as giving an composition life.  He was quoted as saying "You see it--you feel it! That is the way it must be. In any art there must be movement or it becomes static--dead."

Works
Much of Nahor's work can be found in Tzfat and general exhibition, and is displayed around the world.

In 1966 he was exhibited at the Museum of Modern Art in Haifa. The successful exhibit was displayed with works by sculptor Aharon Ashkenazi.

Exhibitions
 1993 B'nai B'rith Klutznick Museum

References

External links
 Entry in the Israeli Museum
 Chaim Nahor online art gallery

1914 births
1993 deaths
Polish emigrants to Israel
Polish painters of Jewish descent
Israeli painters